Cristina Emilia Ríos Saavdera (born 20 May 1988) is a Chilean politician who currently serves as mayor of Ñuñoa.

References

External Links
 

1988 births
Living people
Pontifical Catholic University of Chile alumni
University of Chile alumni
Democratic Revolution politicians